"One of Us" is a song by American singer Joan Osborne for her debut studio album, Relish (1995). Written by Eric Bazilian of the Hooters and produced by Rick Chertoff, the song was released on November 21, 1995, as Osborne's debut single and lead single from Relish, and it became a hit in November of that year, peaking at number four on the US Billboard Hot 100 and earning three Grammy nominations.

"One of Us" was also a hit around the world, topping the charts in Australia, Belgium, Canada, and Sweden, reaching number six on the UK Singles Chart, and becoming a top-20 hit in at least 12 other countries. The song went on to serve as the opening theme for the American television series Joan of Arcadia.

Background
Regarding Eric Bazilian's experience with "One of Us", he said, "I wrote that song one night — the quickest song I ever wrote — to impress a girl. Which worked, because we're married and have two kids. But we were in the middle of writing Joan's album, which was a group effort with Rick Chertoff and Joan and Rob and I, and I did a demo of 'One of Us,' this wacky little demo which I ended up putting as a hidden track on the CD of my first solo record, and I played [it] for them. And it really hadn't even occurred to me that it was something that Joan might do, but Rick, in his wisdom, asked Joan if she thought she could sing it. And I think it was better that he asked it that way rather than 'Do you want to sing it?' Because the answer to that might not have been yes. But she definitely said she could sing it, and we did a little live demo of a guitar and her singing it. And when I got into my car and popped the cassette in, I started practicing the Grammy speech that I should've gotten to give." For the lead and solo, Bazilian used his 1954 Gibson Gold Top Les Paul for the studio recording.

Lyrics
The song deals with various aspects of belief in an anthropomorphic God by asking questions inviting the listener to consider how one might relate to such a God: for example "Would you call [God's name] to his face?" or "Would you want to see [God's face] if seeing meant that you would have to believe in things like heaven and in Jesus and the saints and all the prophets?"

The album version starts off with the first four lines of a recording titled "The Aeroplane Ride", made on October 27, 1937, by American folklorist Alan Lomax and his wife Elizabeth for the Archive of American Folk Song at the Library of Congress, with Mrs. Nell Hampton of Salyersville, Kentucky, singing a variation of the 1928 John S. McConnell hymn "Heavenly Aeroplane".

Critical reception
Roch Parisien from AllMusic called the song "a simple, direct statement of faith, honest and unadorned, one framed in a near-perfect chorus and delectable Neil Young-ish guitar riff". Alan Jones from Music Week wrote, "Joan Osborne has come up with a delicious debut single 'One of Us' – an electrically charged and retro-styled song with an intimate vocal. The track addresses the question 'What if God was one of us?, just a slob like one of us' placing him on the bus and taking phone calls from the Pope, doing so with humour, energy and a great tune, in a taut clutter-free production. A real find." Paul Evans from Rolling Stone said it "imagines a God as hurt as any human".

In 2007, the song was ranked at number 54 on VH1's "100 Greatest Songs of the '90s" and number ten on the network's "40 Greatest One Hit Wonders of the '90s".

Music video
The accompanying music video for "One of Us" was directed by Mark Seliger and Fred Woodward, and was mainly shot in Coney Island, with various attractions like rollercoasters, ferris wheels and the New York Aquarium shown, interchanged with vintage-looking shots in sepia, and Osborne singing in front of the camera.

Track listings

 US and Australian CD and cassette single
 "One of Us" (album version) – 5:21
 "Dracula Moon" – 6:21

 European CD single and UK cassette single
 "One of Us" (edit) – 4:16
 "One of Us" (album version) – 5:21

 UK CD single
 "One of Us" (edit) – 4:16
 "Dracula Moon" – 6:21
 "One of Us" – 5:21
 "Crazy Baby" (live from Fox Theatre) – 8:06

Personnel
 Joan Osborne – lead vocals
 Eric Bazilian – guitars, backing vocals, electric piano
 Mark Egan – bass
 Rob Hyman – drums, Mellotron, backing vocals
 William Wittman – engineering, mixing

Charts

Weekly charts
{|class="wikitable sortable plainrowheaders" style="text-align:center"
|+Weekly chart performance for "One of Us"
!Chart (1995–1996)
!Peakposition
|-

|-

|-

|-

|-

|-

|-

|-
!scope="row"|Czech Republic (IFPI CR)
|2
|-
!scope="row"|Denmark (IFPI)
|2
|-
!scope="row"|Europe (Eurochart Hot 100)
|7
|-

|-

|-

|-
!scope="row"|Hungary (Mahasz)
|2
|-
!scope="row"|Iceland (Íslenski Listinn Topp 40)
|2
|-

|-

|-

|-

|-

|-

|-

|-

|-

|-

|-

|-

|-

|-

|-

|-
!scope="row"|US Cash Box Top 100
|3
|}

Year-end charts

Certifications

Release history

Cover versions and parodies
 In 1996, Prince covered this song from on his album Emancipation with backing vocals from his wife Mayte Garcia.
 Bob Rivers wrote the parody "What If God Smoked Cannabis?" in 1997 (often incorrectly attributed to "Weird Al" Yankovic). A less well-known parody with the same title but different lyrics was produced in 1995 by Cincinnati radio station WEBN.
 The 1999 film Austin Powers: The Spy Who Shagged Me features a scene where Dr. Evil performs the song on piano, accompanied by his clone Mini-Me.
 In the 2001 film Vanilla Sky, the character David Aames (Tom Cruise) sings the song while lying down on bed before having an operation.
 The song is covered on the Glee episode "Grilled Cheesus", by the actors Jenna Ushkowitz, Lea Michele, Cory Monteith, Amber Riley, Chris Colfer, and Dianna Agron.
 German singer/songwriter Stefan Stoppok published his version of the song in 2000, with him performing together with bass player Reggie Worthy.
 Lavie Tidhar referenced the song's chorus in his 2020 book By Force Alone'' that reimagines the Arthurian legend. Merlin ponders how he might be remembered: "...will they see him as he truly was, just a guy like all of us, just a stranger on a crumbling truss, trying to make his way home?"

See also
 List of number-one singles in Australia during the 1990s
 List of RPM Rock/Alternative number-one singles (Canada)
 List of Swedish number-one hits
 Ultratop 50 number-one hits of 1996

References

External links
 Rock on the Net link
 "The Heavenly Airplane" featured in the album version

1995 debut singles
1995 songs
1996 singles
Contemporary Christian songs
Joan Osborne songs
Number-one singles in Australia
Number-one singles in Sweden
Prince (musician) songs
RPM Top Singles number-one singles
Song recordings produced by Rick Chertoff
Songs written by Eric Bazilian
Ultratop 50 Singles (Flanders) number-one singles